Octobre is a 1994 Quebec film directed by filmmaker and noted independentist Pierre Falardeau. It tells a version of the October Crisis from the point of view of the Chénier Cell, the FLQ terrorist cell who in 1970 kidnapped and murdered Quebec minister and Deputy Premier Pierre Laporte, as reported to director Pierre Falardeau by Chénier Cell member Francis Simard during interviews in jail over a period of 5 years. The film is based on the 1982 book Pour en finir avec Octobre by Francis Simard, who was one of the members of the Chénier Cell. The film was co-produced by the National Film Board of Canada.

Notable cast
 Maryse Ouellet
 Luc Picard
 Serge Houde

See also
 Cinema of Quebec
 History of Quebec

External links
 
 NFB Web page (in French)

References

1994 films
Quebec films
Canadian drama films
Political films based on actual events
National Film Board of Canada films
Films shot in Montreal
Films set in Montreal
October Crisis
Films directed by Pierre Falardeau
French-language Canadian films
1990s Canadian films